Kleine Ohe (also: Schöllnach) is a river of Bavaria, Germany. It is a left tributary of the Danube near Hofkirchen.

The river also named Schöllnach, which rises near the Brotjacklriegel, drains the low mountain range to the south. It passes through several villages with similar names, such as Markt Schöllnach, Schöllnstein and the districts of Hofkirchen (Donau) Ober- and Unterschöllnach.

See also
List of rivers of Bavaria

References

Rivers of Bavaria
Rivers of Germany